Faccini is an Italian surname. Notable people with the surname include:

Paolo Alberto Faccini (born 1961), Italian footballer
Piers Faccini (born 1970), English singer, painter, and songwriter
Pietro Faccini (1562–1602), Italian painter, draughtsman, and printmaker
 

Italian-language surnames